Milinović is a Bosnian, Bunjevac, Croatian and Serbian surname, derived from the noun milina (grace, pleasure, enjoyment). The surname refers to the medieval clan spreading out into a few family branches, mostly in the territory of former Austria-Hungary. It may refer to:

Damir Milinović (born 1972), Croatian football player
Darko Milinović (born 1963), Croatian politician
 (born 1980), Serbian singer and TV personality
Miloš Milinović (born 1984), Serbian football player
 (born 1954), Serbian researcher and professor
Šimun Milinović (1835–1910), Croatian bishop
Tinka Milinović (born 1973), Bosnian-born American musician and TV personality
Tomo Milinović (1770–1846), Serbian revolutionary

See also

References 

 Павловић, С. (2007). Трагови. Сарајево.

Croatian surnames
Serbian surnames